= Plinga =

German video game publisher

Plinga GmbH
- Industry: Video games, Social Network Service, Mobile games, Social Games
- Founded: June 2009
- Headquarters: Berlin, Germany
- Website: https://www.plinga.com/

Plinga is an Online F2P games publisher located in Berlin, Germany. The company is partnered with leading web and mobile web developers, publishing their games to Plinga's network of selected partner portals and social networks across the globe. Plinga was founded in June 2009.
